Kao Fu-yao is a Taiwanese politician. He was the Deputy Minister of the Public Construction Commission since 20 May 2016.

Education
Kao obtained his bachelor's degree in law from National Chung Hsing University.

References

Living people
National Chung Hsing University alumni
Government ministers of Taiwan
Year of birth missing (living people)